Albert Charles Delmas (May 20, 1911 in San Francisco, California – December 4, 1979 in Huntington Beach, California), is a former professional baseball player who played second base in the major leagues for the Brooklyn Dodgers. He attended Stanford University.

After his brief stint with the Dodgers, he played minor league ball with four teams in the International League in 1934 and 1935.

External links

1911 births
1979 deaths
Stanford Cardinal baseball players
Major League Baseball second basemen
Baseball players from San Francisco
Brooklyn Dodgers players
Richmond Colts players
Albany Senators players
Montreal Royals players
Toronto Maple Leafs (International League) players
Buffalo Bisons (minor league) players